Dunckerocampus chapmani (glowtail pipefish, or New Caledonian pipefish) is a species of marine fish of the family Syngnathidae. It has only been recorded in the vicinity of the city of Noumea. It is expected to feed on small parasitic crustaceans that grow on other fishes, similar to most other members of its genus. This species is ovoviviparous, with males carrying eggs and giving birth to live young. The eggs of D. chapmani are particularly large, meaning that only 30 per brood are produced, which is quite low for a pipefish.

References

Further reading

Encyclopedia of Life

chapmani
Marine fish
Fish described in 1953